Fereydoun 'Fred' Aghazadeh is a Professor in the Industrial Engineering Program and Georgia Gulf Distinguished Professor of Engineering at Louisiana State University.

Biography
Aghazadeh received his BSIE, MSIE, and Ph.D. degrees from Texas Tech University. Upon graduation in 1982, he joined the Industrial Engineering (IE) Department at the University of Alabama. After two years, he was invited to join the IE department at Louisiana State University and started an Industrial Ergonomics and Safety Engineering program. The IE program at LSU was a teaching program. Aghazadeh was instrumental in changing the department's direction from an undergraduate program to reputable research and graduate study program. As the graduate program coordinator of the department, he has recruited many students and has personally directed the work of 60 doctorate and master's students. He has contributed to the operation of the university by leading or having membership in over 45 various campus-wide committees. He was a part of a select group of planning task force in 2020, which developed a strategic plan for the College of Engineering at LSU. He was also a member of LSU Chancellor’s Realignment Task Force, which is developing a plan to realign various colleges and departments within the University.

Awards and honors

Aghazadeh received the IIE Fellow award from the Institute of Industrial and Systems Engineers in the year 2014. He was elected a Fellow of the Institute for Ergonomics and Human Factors (formerly the Ergonomics Society) for a significant contribution to the practice of teaching and research in ergonomics. He was awarded the Ralph R. Teetor Award by the Society of Automotive Engineers for significant contribution to teaching, research, and student development, and was recognized as one of the top engineering educators in the U.S. LSU College of Engineering awarded him the Georgia Gulf Distinguished Professorship. He was a Faculty Fellow at NASA Johnson Space Center in the summer of 2003 and 2004.

References

External links

Living people
Texas Tech University alumni
University of Alabama alumni
American engineers
Louisiana State University faculty
Year of birth missing (living people)